Harsimus Cove is a station on the Hudson–Bergen Light Rail (HBLR) located at Metro Plaza Drive in the Harsimus Section of downtown Jersey City, New Jersey. It is served by the 8th Street-Hoboken and West Side Avenue-Tonnelle Avenue branches at all times, and the Bayonne Flyer during rush hours.

The station opened on November 18, 2000. There are two tracks and two side platforms, each with a canopy. It is located on a private right-of-way with 4th Street to the north and 2nd Street to the south.

Station layout

Image gallery

Vicinity
Grace Church Van Vorst
Harborside Financial Center
Harsimus Stem Embankment
Hudson and Manhattan Railroad Powerhouse
Hudson River Waterfront Walkway
Powerhouse Arts District
Newport Centre Mall

See also
Harsimus Branch
Horseshoe, Jersey City
Pavonia
Pavonia Terminal
Van Vorst Township

References

External links

 Station from 4th Street from Google Maps Street View
 Platforms from Google Maps Street View
Hudson-Bergen Light Rail stations
Transportation in Jersey City, New Jersey
Railway stations in the United States opened in 2000
2000 establishments in New Jersey